Lactuca orientalis is a Eurasian species of plant in the tribe Cichorieae within the family Asteraceae. It is widespread across the Middle East and southern Asia as far east as Tibet.

Lactuca orientalis is a branching subshrub up to 60 cm tall. Leaves are both on the stem and also clustered in a circle around the base. The plant produces one flower head per branch, each head with 4–5 yellow ray flowers but no disc flowers.

References

External links
Photo of herbarium specimen at Missouri Botanical Garden, collected in Persia (Iran) in 1842

orientalis
Plants described in 1841
Flora of Asia
Taxa named by Pierre Edmond Boissier